Maralyn A. Chase (née Mayfield, born January 6, 1942) is a former Democratic member of the Washington State Senate, representing the 32nd district from 2011 to 2019. Before her election to the Senate, she served in the Washington State House of Representatives from 2002 to 2011.

Career 
In 1997, Chase became an associate of Women's Institute for Freedom of the Press (WIFP). WIFP is an American nonprofit publishing organization. The organization works to increase communication between women and connect the public with forms of women-based media.

Chase was appointed by the legislature after Representative Carolyn Edmonds resigned in November 2001 to serve on the King County Council. She was reelected in 2002, 2004, 2006, and 2008.

In 2010, Chase ran for the Senate seat vacated by Senator Darlene Fairley. She was reelected in 2014, and lost her reelection in 2018 to Jesse Salomon.

An amendment added to Senate Bill 5575 by Maralyn Chase added a Georgia-Pacific paper mill in Camas, WA to the list of pre-1999 biomass facilities that may generate renewable electricity.

Election results

2008

2006

2004

2002

References

External links
Washington State Legislature - Rep. Maralyn Chase official WA Senate website
Project Vote Smart - Senator Maralyn Chase (WA) profile
Follow the Money - Maralyn Chase
2006 2004 2002 campaign contributions

1942 births
Living people
Democratic Party Washington (state) state senators
Democratic Party members of the Washington House of Representatives
Women state legislators in Washington (state)
People from Edmonds, Washington
21st-century American politicians
21st-century American women politicians